Battle of Tunis may refer to:

Battle of White Tunis (310 BC)
Battle of the Bagradas (255 BC)
Siege of Tunis (Mercenary War) (238 BC)
Battle of Lake Tunis (149 BC)
Eighth Crusade (1270)
Revolutions of Tunis (1675–1705)
Tunisia Campaign (1942–43)
Run for Tunis (1942)
Operation Flax (1943)
Operations Vulcan and Strike (1943)

See also
Conquest of Tunis (disambiguation)